Private Jacob Cart (1843 – April 24, 1882) was an American soldier who fought in the American Civil War. Cart received the country's highest award for bravery during combat, the Medal of Honor, for his action during the Battle of Fredericksburg in Virginia on 13 December 1862. He was honored with the award on 25 November 1864.

Biography
Cart was born in Carlisle, Pennsylvania in 1843. He enlisted into the 7th Pennsylvania Reserve Corps. He died on 24 April 1882 and his remains are interred at the Ashland Cemetery in Pennsylvania.

Medal of Honor citation

See also

List of American Civil War Medal of Honor recipients: A–F

References

1843 births
1882 deaths
People of Pennsylvania in the American Civil War
Union Army officers
United States Army Medal of Honor recipients
American Civil War recipients of the Medal of Honor